Aplastodiscus heterophonicus is a species of frog endemic to Brazil. It has been observed in the Espinhaço mountains between 608 and 1326 meters above sea level.

Original description

References

heterophonicus
Frogs of South America
Endemic fauna of Brazil
Amphibians described in 2021